Circus Joseph Ashton, formerly trading as Ashton's Circus, is the longest-surviving circus in Australia, pre-dating most others in the English-speaking world. 

The circus was founded in Hobart, Tasmania, in 1847 by Thomas Mollor, and acquired in February 1850 by James Henry Ashton, a man schooled in the tradition of English circus and who had experienced the hard times of the nineteenth century. The circus operated as the Royal Amphitheatre or Royal Circus.

Ashton's at its height,  had more than 180 personnel and 80 animals and thousands of dollars worth of equipment, and toured internationally in New Zealand and Papua New Guinea

When founder James Henry Ashton died in 1889, his son Fred, then aged 22, inherited the circus. The circus continued to be handed down throughout the family, and today it is run by the 6th generation of Ashtons, Michelle and Joseph and their sons, Jordan and Merrik. As Joseph had founded 'Circus Joseph Ashton' in 1998 prior to his grandfather's retirement in 2000, it was decided to apply this name to the family's main circus reflecting the current state of ownership and operations. The prior name of "Ashton's Circus" was therefore retired.

Circus Joseph Ashton travels mainly in South Australia and Western Australia.

The company employed Tommy Hanlon Jr., after his career in television

Other circuses and entertainment businesses run by other members of the Ashton family include Ashton Entertainment, Infamous the Show, Lorraine Ashton's Classic Circus, and Circus Xsavia.

See also
List of circuses and circus owners

References

External links

The Penny Gaff website on history of circus and travelling show people with a focus on Australia.
Ashton's Circus photographs, State Library of Queensland. Photographs of the August 1988 Ashton's Circus in Brisbane, Queensland.

Australian companies established in 1847
Entertainment companies established in 1847
Australian circuses
Circuses